Komsomolets were male members of Komsomol, the former Soviet youth organization. The term may also refer to:

Military
 Soviet submarine K-278 Komsomolets, a nuclear submarine which caught fire and sank off Norway
 Komsomolets-class torpedo boat, motor torpedo boat of World War II era; See List of ships of Russia by project number
 Komsomolets armored tractor, Soviet prime mover vehicle

Places
 Komsomolets Island, an island in the Russian Arctic
 Komsomolets (rural locality), several rural localities in Russia
 Mount Komsomolets, a mountain in Ala Archa National Park, Kyrgyzstan

Other uses
 Komsomolets (camera), Soviet camera, a predecessor of Lubitel

See also
 Komsomol (disambiguation)
 Komsomolsk (disambiguation)
 Komsomolsky (disambiguation)